The 1996–97 Umaglesi Liga was the eighth season of top-tier football in Georgia. It began on 1 August 1996 and ended on 30 May 1997. Dinamo Tbilisi were the defending champions.

Location

League standings

Results

Top goalscorers

See also
1996–97 Pirveli Liga
1996–97 Georgian Cup

References
Georgia - List of final tables (RSSSF)

Erovnuli Liga seasons
1
Georgia